Joshua or Josh Greene may refer to:

Joshua Greene (psychologist), experimental psychologist at Harvard University
Joshua Greene (wine), wine critic, publisher and editor-in-chief of Wine & Spirits
Josh Greene (artist), American conceptual artist
Joshua Greene (mathematician), (Joshua E. Greene), the winner of the 2002 Morgan Prize

See also
Joshua Green (disambiguation)